Derek Ho (September 26, 1964 – July 17, 2020) was a Hawaiian Chinese surfer who won the world surfing championship in 1993. Ho was born in Kailua, Honolulu County, Hawaii. He began surfing at the age of three, and won the world title at age 29, making him the first Native Hawaiian world champion. Derek Ho was the brother of Michael Ho, another champion surfer, and the first cousin of Don Ho, the Hawaiian singer. He was the uncle of professional surfers Mason Ho and Coco Ho.

On July 17, 2020, Ho was hospitalized after suffering a heart attack; he subsequently fell into a coma and died late that afternoon.

See also
ASP World Tour

References

1964 births
2020 deaths
American sportspeople of Chinese descent
American surfers
Hawaii people of Chinese descent
People from Honolulu County, Hawaii
Sportspeople from Hawaii
World Surf League surfers